

Piedmont Park

Piedmont Park, site of the 1895 Cotton States Expo, is Atlanta's iconic green space. The Midtown park, which underwent a major renovation and expansion in 2010, attracts visitors from across the region and hosts various cultural events throughout the year. Piedmont Park also features a large 3-acre dog park with sections for large and small dogs.

Downtown parks

Centennial Olympic Park forms a centerpoint for downtown visitors in and around which key visitor attractions are located; nearby Woodruff Park and Hurt Park cater to the downtown lunch crowd.

Other prominent parks
Grant Park, located on the east side, is home to the city zoo., Chastain Park, the primary recreational center for the northern Buckhead district, contains an amphitheater for live music concerts. Atlanta's largest park, Southside Park, is remote and nearly undeveloped, and the planned Westside Park in northwest Atlanta, which will be constructed on the site of a former gravel quarry, will eclipse Southside as the city's largest. Also, Perkerson Park in Southwest Atlanta is home to the city's only permanent Disc Golf course. Atlanta's neighborhoods are dotted with hundreds of neighborhood parks such as John Howell Park in Virginia-Highland and Perkerson Park in the Capitol View/Sylvan Hills area. Freedom Park is Atlanta's largest passive park, with over 200 acres of linear greenspace going through Atlanta's historic east side neighborhoods. It was designated as Atlanta's Public Art Park by the Atlanta City Council in 2007.

Nature preserves

Several nature preserves line the south fork of Peachtree Creek in the Morningside neighborhood, including the Morningside Nature Preserve, while part of the Chattahoochee River National Recreation Area lies in the city's northwest corner.

Atlanta Botanical Garden

The Atlanta Botanical Garden is home to the Canopy Walk, a 600-foot elevated walkway ambling 40 feet from the ground through a 15-acre forest of mature hardwoods, and the only canopy-level pathway of its kind in the United States.

Trails

BeltLine

The BeltLine, a former rail corridor that forms a 22-mile loop around Atlanta's central neighborhoods, has been acquired and transformed into public space. Most of the corridor opened in the late-2000s as a walking path, with plans for development of multi-use trails and, eventually, public transit. A trail has already been constructed near the West End neighborhood, while another one, under construction as of 2012, will connect Piedmont Park to Inman Park. BeltLine projects will increase Atlanta's park space by 40%, including two new parks: Historic Fourth Ward Park, now open, and Westside Park.

PATH
In addition to BeltLine trails, PATH maintains a network of biking and walking trails in Metro Atlanta, including one that traverses Atlanta's east side, traveling past the Carter Center and through Freedom Park.

PATH400 will be a major addition to the PATH network through Buckhead.

The Cheshire Farm Trail lines the South Fork of Peachtree Creek from Lindbergh Ave. to Cheshire Bridge Road, and Maiden Trail parallels Ponce de Leon Avenue in Virginia-Highland.

External links
 Atlanta Department of Parks, Recreation and Cultural Affairs

References